Militsioner is an upcoming video game for Microsoft Windows developed and published by TallBoys.

Gameplay
The player takes control of a character in a town in Russia who is watched by a giant policeman. The player's goal is to try to escape from the town and avoid being discovered by the giant policeman and being arrested. The player can use a microphone for talking in conversations.

Development
When a trailer was published in September 2020 on Twitter it went viral. In the Russian-speaking media, it was criticized for being Russophobic and the giant policeman was compared to Uncle Styopa.
Game designer Vladimir Semenets said he does not want to create an evil image about police but wants to tell a story about the life in Russia, he also mentioned issues about responsibility and power.

Inspirations for Militsioner comes from the books Crime and Punishment, The Trial and films directed by Andrei Tarkovsky and Nikita Mikhalkov.

References

External links
Official website
Militsioner at Steam

Upcoming video games
Video games about police officers
Video games set in Russia
Windows games
Windows-only games
Microphone-controlled computer games
Video games developed in Russia